African Waltz is an album by jazz saxophonist Cannonball Adderley, released on the Riverside label and performed by Adderley with an orchestra conducted by Ernie Wilkins. The title track had been a UK hit single for Johnny Dankworth.

Reception
The AllMusic review by Scott Yanow awarded the album three stars and states: "The music on this CD reissue is better than it should be. Cannonball Adderley had a fluke hit with 'African Waltz' so a full album was recorded with the hope of coming up with additional hits... There is some strong material on the set (including 'West Coast Blues', 'Stockholm Sweetnin' ' and a remake of 'This Here') but the results are not too substantial and this was not that big a seller; it is still a reasonably enjoyable effort". The Penguin Guide to Jazz awarded the album three stars stating "'A departure from and an extension of what the Adderleys were doing in their small groups. Ernie Wilkins arranges a set of full-bodied top-heavy charts which Adderley has to jostle with to create their own space, and the music's worth hearing for its Sheer Brashness and impact".

Track listing 
 "Something Different" (Chuck Mangione) – 3:04  
 "West Coast Blues" (Wes Montgomery) – 4:04  
 "Smoke Gets in Your Eyes" (Jerome Kern, Otto Harbach) – 3:02  
 "The Uptown" (Junior Mance) – 2:15  
 "Stockholm Sweetnin'" (Quincy Jones) – 3:41  
 "African Waltz" (Galt MacDermot) – 2:12  
 "Blue Brass Groove" (Nat Adderley) – 4:52  
 "Kelly Blue" (Wynton Kelly) – 3:51  
 "Letter from Home" (Mance) – 2:00  
 "I'll Close My Eyes" (Buddy Kaye, Billy Reid) – 3:42  
 "This Here" (Bobby Timmons) – 3:00 Bonus track on CD
 Recorded at Plaza Sound Studio, NYC, on February 28 (tracks 6 & 8), May 9 (tracks 1–3, 7, 9 & 11), and May 15 (tracks 4, 5, 10 & 12), 1961.

Personnel 
 Cannonball Adderley – alto saxophone
 Nat Adderley, Joe Newman, Ernie Royal, Clark Terry, Nick Travis  – trumpet
 Jimmy Cleveland, George Matthews, Arnett Sparrow, Melba Liston – trombone
 Bob Brookmeyer – valve trombone
 Paul Faulise – bass trombone
 Don Butterfield – tuba
 George Dorsey – alto saxophone, flute
 Oliver Nelson – tenor saxophone, flute
 Jerome Richardson – tenor saxophone, flute, piccolo
 Arthur Clarke – baritone saxophone
 Wynton Kelly – piano
 Sam Jones – bass
 Charlie Persip, Louis Hayes – drums
 Michael Olatunji – congas, bongos
 Ray Barretto – congas 
 Ernie Wilkins – arranger

Production 
 Orrin Keepnews – Producer
 Ken Deardoff – Album design
 Hugh Bell – Cover photography
 Steve Schapiro – Back-liner photography
 Ray Fowler – Recording engineer
 Riverside Records produced by Bill Grauer Productions, Inc.

References 

1961 albums
Riverside Records albums
Cannonball Adderley albums
Albums produced by Orrin Keepnews
Albums arranged by Ernie Wilkins
Albums conducted by Ernie Wilkins